Coprosma neglecta is a coastal shrub that is native to New Zealand. C. neglecta is found around the North Cape of New Zealand.

Comprosma neglecta grows up to 50 centimetres tall and has small, circular, glossy green leaves. The plant produces orange-red fruit.

References

neglecta
Flora of New Zealand
Hybrid plants